Malmaley is a town in the southwestern Gedo region of Somalia.  It is located in the Dolow District.

References

Malmaley

Populated places in Gedo